Malbon is a surname of the descendants of William Malbank, First Baron of Nantwich.

People 
 Anthony Malbon (born 1991), English footballer
 Fabian Malbon (born 1946), Vice Admiral and Lieutenant Governor of Guernsey
 John Malbon Thompson (1830–1908), Australian lawyer and politician
 Joy Malbon, Canadian journalist

Places 
 Malbon, Queensland, town in Kuridala, Shire of Cloncurry, Australia

See also
 William Malbank, 1st Baron of Wich Malbank
 William Malbank, 3rd Baron of Wich Malbank
 Malbank School and Sixth Form College, a secondary school in Nantwich

References

External links
 Malbon at the Surname Database